Macrianus is a Roman personal name. People with this name include:

 Macrianus Major, Roman usurper
 Macrianus Minor, son of Macrianus Major
 Macrianus, 4th century CE Alamannic king